Crewe Engineering and Design UTC is a university technical college located in Crewe, Cheshire, England.

The UTC is sponsored by Manchester Metropolitan University, Bentley Motors Limited, OSL Rail and Engineering Service and several other local engineering and design companies. It opened in September 2016.

Context
Crewe is a small Cheshire town with a significant railway and engineering history. Crewe Engineering and Design UTC was established to address the shortage of youngsters entering engineering in 2016, and has been rated good by Ofsted who described it as ‘transforming’ the lives of its students. .

References

External links
Crewe Engineering and Design UTC

University Technical Colleges
Secondary schools in the Borough of Cheshire East
Crewe
Educational institutions established in 2016
2016 establishments in England
Manchester Metropolitan University